Clarence R. Walker (April 13, 1892 - July 22, 1959) served in the California State Assembly for the 77th district from 1935 to 1941 and during World War I he served in the United States Army.

References

United States Army personnel of World War I
20th-century American politicians
Republican Party members of the California State Assembly
1892 births
1959 deaths